Coquille, the French word for "shell" (like an oyster shell), can refer to:

People
 Coquille people, a Native American tribe in Oregon
 Coquille Indian Tribe, a federally recognized Native American tribal entity in Oregon
 Guy Coquille (1523–1603), French jurist

Places
 Coquille, Oregon, a city in the U.S. state of Oregon
 La Coquille, a village and commune in the Dordogne département of western France
 Coquille River (Oregon), a river in Oregon
 Coquille River (Normandin River), a tributary of Nicabau Lake in Quebec, Canada

Other uses
 Coquille (steamboat), a 1908 propeller-driven steamboat in Oregon, United States
 French frigate Coquille (1794), French Navy ship later renamed HMS Coquille
 French ship Astrolabe (1811), originally christened Coquille
 Coquille (engineering), a form for metal casting
 Coquille board, a type of textured drawing paper

See also